Rio Pardo is a municipality in the state of Rio Grande do Sul in Brazil. The population is 38,265 (2020 est.) in an area of 2051 km². The elevation is 41 m.

References

Municipalities in Rio Grande do Sul